Bruce Hagen (born June 21, 1930) is a North Dakota politician who served as North Dakota Public Service Commissioner from 1961 to 2000. He is known as the only member of the Democratic Party to ever serve on the North Dakota Public Service Commission (or its predecessor, the North Dakota Board of Railroad Commissioners).

Notes

North Dakota Public Service Commissioners
1930 births
Living people
North Dakota Democrats